The extensor hallucis longus muscle is a thin skeletal muscle, situated between the tibialis anterior and the extensor digitorum longus. It extends the big toe and dorsiflects the foot. It also assists with foot eversion and inversion.

Structure 
The extensor hallucis longus muscle arises from the anterior surface of the fibula for about the middle two-fourths of its extent, medial to the origin of the extensor digitorum longus muscle. It also arises from the interosseous membrane of the leg to a similar extent.

The anterior tibial vessels and deep fibular nerve lie between it and the tibialis anterior.

The fibers pass downward, and end in a tendon, which occupies the anterior border of the muscle, passes through a distinct compartment in the cruciate crural ligament, crosses from the lateral to the medial side of the anterior tibial vessels near the bend of the ankle, and is inserted into the base of the distal phalanx of the great toe.

Opposite the metatarsophalangeal articulation, the tendon gives off a thin prolongation on either side, to cover the surface of the joint.

An expansion from the medial side of the tendon is usually inserted into the base of the proximal phalanx.

Nerve supply
The extensor hallucis longus muscle is supplied by the deep fibular nerve, a branch of common fibular nerve, which includes L4, L5, and S1 spinal nerve roots.

Variations
Occasionally united at its origin with the extensor digitorum longus.

The extensor ossis metatarsi hallucis, a small muscle, sometimes found as a slip from the extensor hallucis longus, or from the tibialis anterior, or from the extensor digitorum longus, or as a distinct muscle; it traverses the same compartment of the transverse ligament with the extensor hallucis longus.

Function 
The extensor hallucis longus muscle extends the big toe, dorsiflects the foot, and also assists with foot eversion and inversion.

Additional Images

References

External links 

  - "The Leg: Muscles"
 University of Washington

Calf muscles
Muscles of the lower limb